Bibio clavipes is a species of fly from the family Bibionidae.

References

Bibionidae
Insects described in 1818
Nematoceran flies of Europe